Boomtown is the Los Angeles themed debut studio album by the American rock duo David & David, released on July 7, 1986, through A&M Records.

Release and reception

Michael Ofjord of AllMusic called Boomtown an "artful record, full of poetry and convincing stories of the hard times that many silently endured." He gave the record four and a half out of five stars, concluding that "one may not want to listen to this record to lift the spirit, but it is a strong reminder of difficult situations faced during what can be perceived by many as the best of times."

At the time of its release, Boomtown had some commercial success, peaking at number 39 on the chart in December. Its singles, "Welcome to the Boomtown", "Swallowed by the Cracks" and "Ain't So Easy", all received airplay, especially on rock-formatted radio stations, and most of them charted on the Billboard Hot 100. In 1995, the album was certified gold in the U.S.

Baerwald and Ricketts played all the instruments on the album except for drums on some tracks which were played by Ed Greene.

Although Baerwald and Ricketts would go on to co-write some of the material for Sheryl Crow's debut album, the duo pursued divergent musical paths with Baerwald developing his solo career and Ricketts working with singer Toni Childs.

Track listing
David Baerwald and David Ricketts wrote all songs on the album, except or "Heroes", written by David Baerwald.

Chart performance

Album

Personnel
Chuck Beeson – art direction
Toni Childs – additional vocals
Judy Clapp – assistant engineering
Paulinho da Costa – percussion
David & David – vocals, guitar, bass guitar, mandolin, dobro, piano, drums, keyboards, harmonica, lap steel guitar
Ed Greene – drums
Bernie Grundman – mastering
Camille Henry – additional vocals
John Beverly Jones – engineering, mixing, recording
Melanie Nissen – photography, design, art direction
John Philip Shenale – programming
Davitt Sigerson – production
Noland Void – additional vocals

References

External links

1986 debut albums
A&M Records albums
David & David albums